Dastjerd-e Aqa Bozorg (also Romanized as Dastjerd-e Āqā Bozorg and Dastjerd-e Aqā Bozorg; also known as Dashtjerd-e Āqā Bozorg and Dastgerd) is a village in Eshaqabad Rural District, Zeberkhan District, Nishapur County, Razavi Khorasan Province, Iran. At the 2006 census, its population was 1,061, in 266 families.

References 

Populated places in Nishapur County